The 2012–13 Southeastern Conference men's basketball season began with practices in October 2012, followed by the start of the regular season in November.  Conference play started in early January 2013, and concluded in March with the 2013 SEC men's basketball tournament at the Bridgestone Arena in Nashville. This was the first season for two former Big 12 teams, as the Texas A&M Aggies and the Missouri Tigers played their first season in the SEC.

Preseason

() first place votes

Preseason All-SEC teams

Coaches select 8 players
Players in bold are choices for SEC Player of the Year

Rankings

Conference Schedules

Conference matrix
This table summarizes the head-to-head results between teams in conference play. (x) indicates games remaining this season.

Postseason

SEC tournament

  March 13–17, 2013 Southeastern Conference Basketball Tournament, Bridgestone Arena, Nashville, TN.

NCAA tournament

National Invitation tournament

NBA Draft

The following 1st & 2nd team All-SEC performers were listed as seniors: Erik Murphy, Elston Turner, Laurence Bowers, Kenny Boynton, Murphy Holloway, Mike Rosario. The deadline for entering the NBA draft is April 29, but once one has declared, the deadline for withdrawing the declaration and retaining NCAA eligibility is April 10. The deadline for submitting information to the NBA Advisory Committee for a 72-hour response is April 3.

The following SEC underclassmen have sought the advice of the NBA's undergraduate advisory committee to determine his draft prospects: 
The following SEC underclassmen declared early for the 2011 draft: Kentavious Caldwell-Pope,  Archie Goodwin, Nerlens Noel, Marshawn Powell, Phil Pressey, B. J. Young

Notes

Honors and awards

All-Americans

All-SEC awards and teams

Coaches

Associated Press

References

External links
SEC website